The 1976 Vermont gubernatorial election took place on November 2, 1976. Incumbent Democrat Thomas P. Salmon did not seek another term as Governor of Vermont, instead running for United States Senate. Republican candidate Richard A. Snelling won the election, defeating Democratic candidate Stella B. Hackel and Liberty Union candidate Bernie Sanders.

Democratic primary

Candidates
Brian D. Burns, Lieutenant Governor of Vermont
Stella B. Hackel, Vermont State Treasurer
Robert O'Brien, state senator

Results

Republican primary

Results

Liberty Union primary

Results

General election

Results

References

Vermont
1976
Gubernatorial
November 1976 events in the United States
Bernie Sanders